Little Girl(s), A Little Girl, or The Little Girl(s)  may refer to:

 Girl, a young female human

Film and television
 Little Girl (film), a 2020 French documentary by Sébastien Lifshitz
 "A Little Girl" (Dynasty), a 1984 television episode
 "The Little Girl" (13 Reasons Why), a 2018 television episode

Literature
A Little Girl Series, an 1896–1909 series of 14 juvenile novels by Amanda Minnie Douglas
The Little Girls, a 1964 novel by Elizabeth Bowen

Music
Little Girls (band), a 2000s/10s Canadian indie rock band
The Little Girls, a 1980s American band
 Little Girl, a 2012 album by Jing Chang

Songs
 "Little Girl" (Miwa song), 2010
 "Little Girl" (Reba McEntire song), 1989
 "Little Girl" (Sandra song), 1986
 "Little Girl" (Syndicate of Sound song), 1966
 "Little Girl (With Blue Eyes)", by Pulp, 1985
 "Little Girl (You're My Miss America)", by the Beach Boys, 1962
 "The Little Girl", by John Michael Montgomery, 2000
 "Little Girls" (Annie song), from the musical, 1977
 "Little Girls" (Oingo Boingo song), 1981
 "Little Girl", by Billy Preston from Encouraging Words, 1970
 "Little Girl", by Bo Diddley from Go Bo Diddley, 1959
 "Little Girl", by Death from Above 1979 from You're a Woman, I'm a Machine, 2004
 "Little Girl", by Dokken from Long Way Home, 2002
 "Little Girl", by Enrique Iglesias from Insomniac, 2007
 "Little Girl", by H-Blockx, 1994
 "Little Girl", by John Mayall from Blues Breakers with Eric Clapton, 1966
 "Little Girl", by Journey from Dream, After Dream, 1980
 "Little Girl", by Lalah Hathaway from Self Portrait, 2008
 "Little Girl", by Loverboy from Loverboy, 1980
 "Little Girl", by Mary Mary from Go Get It, 2012
 "Little Girl", by the Monkees from The Monkees Present, 1969
 "Little Girl", by Ritchie Valens from Ritchie, 1959
 "Little Girl", by Roxette from Room Service, 2001
 "Little Girl", by Them from The Angry Young Them, 1965
 "Little Girl", by the Troggs, 1968
 "Little Girl", by the Wilkinsons from Highway, 2005
 "Little Girl", written by Madeline Hyde and Francis Henry; see 1931 in music § Published popular music
 "Little Girls", by Extreme from Extreme, 1989
 "Little Girls", by Momus from Scobberlotchers, 2016
 "¿Viva La Gloria? (Little Girl)", by Green Day from 21st Century Breakdown, 2009